Think Tram was a Victorian Government program aimed at improving Melbourne's tram network. The intended benefits were reduced travel time and better reliability, and better accessibility. The program was run by VicRoads, in partnership with Yarra Trams and Public Transport Victoria. The program targets individual routes or streets with a mixture of different treatments, including the sometimes controversial superstops.

Types of treatment

Superstops
Superstops are wheelchair-accessible platform stops, with rain shelters, seating, and real time arrival displays. Superstops, when served by low-floor trams, comply with the Disability Discrimination Act 1992. In general, introduction of superstops along a route has been accompanied by a reduction in the total number of stops and relocation of existing stops.

Traffic light priority
Traffic lights are switched in favour of approaching trams before (or as soon as possible after) a tram stops at an intersection. Right turning traffic may also be given priority to clear the path of the tram.

Separation kerbing and right turn bans

Yellow separation strips and/or signage are introduced to prevent turning cars from blocking the progress of trams. Right-turn bans and hook turns have been introduced at certain intersections.

Targeted routes
Swanston Street / St Kilda Road
Route 19 (Royal Parade / Sydney Road)
Bridge Road (Routes 48 and 75)
Route 55 (Queensbridge Street, William Street, Peel Street, Flemington Road)
Route 59 (Peel Street, Flemington Road)
Route 86 (Bourke Street, Gertrude Street, Smith Street, High Street, Plenty Road)
Route 109 (Collins Street, Spencer Street, Victoria Parade)
Route 112 (Clarendon Street, Brunswick Street, St Georges Road)

Criticism
While many tram users have welcomed the new Superstops, there has also been complaints at the reduction in the number of stops and the introduction of new mid-block stops. A "funeral", coordinated by the Public Transport Users Association, was held for the tram stops being closed, featuring a procession with coffin from the former tram stops to the Transport Minister's office.  Despite these protests, the program continued.

During a trial of a number of Think Tram treatments in Clarendon Street, South Melbourne, traders complained about the reduction in parking availability. They successfully lobbied to have the departure-side stops returned to their old arrival-side configuration, although the introduced hook turns were kept.

References

Further reading
Some Information To Get You Thinking, VicRoads Publication No. 01079

Public transport in Melbourne
Trams in Melbourne